This topic reveals just the World Triathlon Series events and their results for 2013.

 April 6 – September 15: 2013 ITU World Triathlon Series; ends with the Grand Final in London
April 6 & 7 at  Auckland
Men's Winner:  Javier Gómez.
Women's Winner:  Anne Haug.
April 18 – 20 at  San Diego
Men's winner:  Alistair Brownlee.
Women's winner:  Gwen Jorgensen.
May 11 & 12 at  Yokohama
Men's winner:  Jonathan Brownlee.
Women's winner:  Gwen Jorgensen.
June 1 & 2 at  Madrid
Men's winner:  Jonathan Brownlee.
Women's winner:  Non Stanford.
July 6 at  Kitzbühel
Men's winner:  Alistair Brownlee.
Women's winner:  Jodie Stimpson.
July 20 & 21 at  Hamburg
Men's winner:  Jonathan Brownlee.
Women's winner:  Anne Haug.
August 24 & 25 at  Stockholm
Men's winner:  Alistair Brownlee.
Women's winner:  Gwen Jorgensen.
September 11 – 15 at  London (Grand Final)
Men's winner:  Javier Gómez.
Women's winner:  Non Stanford.

References

 
Triathlon by year